Llantrisant is a village in Monmouthshire, south east Wales, United Kingdom. The community population at the 2011 census was 475.

Location 
The village is sited on the eastern bank of the River Usk and the Usk Valley Walk long distance footpath passes through the village after descending from the Wentwood escarpment.

History and amenities 

The name of the village translates as the Parish of the Three Saints, and the parish church is the Church of St Peter, St Paul and St John. The church is fourteenth century in origin but nothing remains of this period beyond a single lancet window in the nave. The remainder is of the fifteenth and sixteenth centuries", and of the restoration by E. A. Landsdowne in 1880–81.

When local historian Fred Hando visited in the late 1950s, the ruin of the ancient St. Bartholomew's chapel was still standing. From the later 19th century, the mill at Llwynau was run by a Henry Moore who moved there from Brecknockshire, together with his seven sons. When the mill stopped working, one of Moore's sons was reputed to have buried the mill-wheel under the floor. The farmhouse at Llwynau dates from the 17th century.

A Norman stone medieval castle is sited close by. The local public house is the Greyhound Inn.

Notes

References
 

Villages in Monmouthshire